Microsoft Azure SQL Database (formerly SQL Azure, SQL Server Data Services, SQL Services, and Windows Azure SQL Database) is a managed cloud database (PaaS) provided as part of Microsoft Azure.

A cloud database is a database that runs on a cloud computing platform, and access to it is provided as a service. Managed database services take care of scalability, backup, and high availability of the database. Azure SQL Database is a managed database service that differs from AWS RDS, which is a container service.

Overview
Microsoft Azure SQL Database includes built-in intelligence that learns app patterns and adapts them to maximize performance, reliability, and data protection. It was originally announced in 2009 and released in 2010.

Key capabilities include:

 Continuous learning of your unique app patterns, adaptive performance tuning, and automatic improvements to reliability and data protection.
 Scaling as needed, with virtually no app downtime.
 Management and monitoring of multitenant apps with isolation benefits of one-customer-per-database.
 Leverage open source tools like a cheetah, sql-cli, VS Code and Microsoft tools like Visual Studio and SQL Server Management Studio, Azure Management Portal, PowerShell, and REST APIs.
 Data protection with encryption, authentication, limiting user access to the subset of the data, continuous monitoring and auditing to help detect potential threats and provide a record of critical events in case of a breach.

Popular use cases
 Relational data storage for cloud-based applications and websites
 Business and consumer web and mobile apps
 Manage databases for multi-tenant apps (software-as-a-service)
 Quickly create dev and test databases to speed up development cycles
 Scale production business services quickly and at a known cost
 Containerize data in the cloud for isolation and security
 Outsource database management in order to focus on value-added services

Design
Azure SQL Database shares the SQL Server 2016 codebase. It is compatible with SQL Server 2014 and 2016 and most of the features available in SQL Server 2016 are available in Azure SQL Database. A list of incompatibilities is published by Microsoft.

Timeline
 2009 – Service announced
 2010 – Service went live
 2014 – New version announced
 2015 – Elastic Pools announced

Pricing
Azure SQL Database is offered either as a Standalone database or Elastic database pool, and is priced in three tiers: Basic, Standard and Premium. Each tier offers different performance levels to accommodate a variety of workloads.

The resources available for Standalone databases are expressed in terms of Database Transaction Units (DTUs) and for elastic pools in terms of elastic DTUs or eDTUs. A DTU is defined as a blended measure of CPU, memory, and data I/O and transaction log I/O in a ratio determined by an OLTP benchmark workload designed to be typical of real-world OLTP workloads.

Databases are available as Standalone databases or in database pools which allow multiple databases to share storage and compute resources.

It is also available as a limited service offering with a trial Web site or Mobile service and eligible for use with an Azure trial subscription.

See also
Microsoft Azure
Oracle Cloud Platform
SQL Server
Amazon Relational Database Service
Relational Database
Cloud computing
Software as a service

References

External links

Microsoft Azure Security Technologies
What is Azure SQL Database?

Azure SQL Database